Mohamed Hajji (1923 in Salé, Morocco - 2003) was a Moroccan historian, encyclopaedist, writer, scholar and a university professor. The author of some forty books, he is particularly famous for his encyclopedia Ma'lamat al-Maghrib, the work of his life.

Biography

Early life and education 
Mohamed was born in Salé, Morocco in 1923 to the Hajji family. After studying Quran, Fiqh, Arabic language, astronomy and Sīrah under ulama like: al-Jilani an-najjar, fqih zin al-Abidin ibn Abud, Hajj Mohamed sbihi, shaykh al-Islam  and Abd ar-Rahman ibn Shuayb ad-dukkali. He followed a regular course at the Institut des Hautes Études Marocaines in 1958, culminating in a diploma in classical Arabic and Translation. In 1961, Mohamed obtained an undergraduate degree in Arabic language and literature from the Faculty of Letters and Human sciences of Rabat and a diploma of higher studies in history from the same Faculty in 1963. In 1976, he obtained a doctorate in letters and human sciences from the Sorbonne in Paris.

Career 
He was the founding director of the private school of the Young Slaoui girl from 1945 to 1948. From 1949 to 1956 he worked as a public education teacher at the College d'Azrou then at the Regional School of Teachers of Rabat. He worked as teacher at the Lycée Moulay Youssef in Rabat from 1956 to 1957 and from 1957 to 1959 he was the director of the regional School of Teachers in Marrakech. From 1959 to 1961, Mohamed worked as a teacher of Arabic then regional inspector of primary education in Rabat. From 1961 to 1962, he held the position of principal inspector at the Ministry of National Education. He also acted as the ministry's delegate in Casablanca from 1961 to 1964. From 1964 to 1967, he occupied the position of head of the research and educational action at the Ministry of National Education. He joined the Faculty of Letters and Human Sciences in Rabat, where he served in various roles from 1967 to 1979; assistant, lecturer and assistant professor. He served as dean of the Faculty of Letters of Rabat from 1979 to 1981, before being director of the Royal College from 1982 to 1984.

Works 
He wrote some forty works some of them are:

Books by Hajji

Editing work 

 Fihris Aḥmad al-Manǧūr

Translations 

 Wasf Ifriqiya
 Ifriqya
 Fas Qabl al-Himaya

References 

1923 births
2003 deaths
20th-century Moroccan historians
21st-century Moroccan historians
Moroccan encyclopedists
People from Salé